Nelson Matías González Huelmo (born 15 October 1980) is a Uruguayan football manager and former professional footballer.

Career
He had a playing career with Rocha, playing in the Uruguayan Primera División throughout 2006. In December 2014, after managing Plaza Congreso and Lavalleja, González was made manager of Rocha's academy. In November 2015, González became manager of Rocha's first-team. He replaced Fabio Castromán who was sacked following a 2–0 defeat to Canadian. He made his managerial debut in a 4–3 Uruguayan Segunda División win over Oriental. He achieved four more wins but it wasn't enough as the club were relegated to the Uruguayan Segunda División Amateur. He subsequently left and was replaced by Neri Machado.

Career statistics
.

References

External links

1980 births
Living people
People from Rocha, Uruguay
Uruguayan footballers
Uruguayan football managers
Association football defenders
Uruguayan Primera División players
Uruguayan Segunda División managers
Rocha F.C. players
Rocha F.C. managers